Jan Feliks Tarnowski (31 July 1471 – 21 March 1507) was a Polish nobleman (szlachcic).

Jan Feliks was owner of Wielowieś, Rzochów and Wadowice estates. He was Chorąży of Kraków since 20 February 1484, starost of Belz since 28 December 1485, Stolnik of the Royal court since 27 May 1494, castellan of Lublin since 27 December 1497, voivode of Lublin Voivodeship before 28 May 1499, voivode of Sandomierz Voivodeship since 6 March 1501, voivode of Kraków Voivodeship and starost of Horodło since 1 September 1505.

Secular senators of the Polish–Lithuanian Commonwealth
1471 births
1507 deaths
15th-century Polish nobility
Jan Feliks
People from Tarnobrzeg
16th-century Polish nobility
16th-century Polish landowners